The CWE Central Canadian Heavyweight Championship is a professional wrestling heavyweight championship in the professional wrestling promotion, Canadian Wrestling's Elite.  The championship was first awarded on September 2, 2001, as the World High Impact Pro Wrestling Central Canadian Heavyweight Championship.  Charlie Hayes was the inaugural champion having won the title in a gauntlet match.  Brett Evans became the final champion under the HIW banner after defeating Tony Novak in the finals a tournament at HIW Monster Brawl VI on October 25, 2019.  Monster Brawl was the final show in HIW history.  It was became a title under CWE banner as they purchased all of High Impact Wrestling's assets and absorbed the company.

As of March 9, 2022, there have been 47 reigns among 29 wrestlers with four vacancies.  The inaugural champion was Charley Hayes. Principal Pound and Rex Roberts have the most reigns at three.  Big Daddy Kash / King Kash has the longest combined reign at 783 days.  Davey O'Doyle has the longest singular reign at 511 days.  Brett Evans has the shortest singular reign at less than one day.  The youngest champion was Alexander Prime having won it when he was 20.  The oldest champion is Principle Pound having won it when he was 40.

The current champion is Rob Stardom who is in his first reign.  He defeated Danny Duggan at The Super Jobber Cup on December 16, 2022.

Title history 

Names

Reigns

|}

Combined reigns

References

High Impact Wrestling Canada championships
Heavyweight wrestling championships
Canadian professional wrestling championships
Regional professional wrestling championships